The City of Fruita  is a home rule municipality located in western Mesa County, Colorado, United States. The city population was 13,395 at the 2020 United States Census. Fruita is a part of the Grand Junction, CO Metropolitan Statistical Area and lies within the Grand Valley. The geography is identified by the bordering Colorado River (historically known as the Grand River) on the southern edge of town, the Uncompahgre Plateau known for its pinyon-juniper landscape, and the Book Cliffs range on the northern edge of the Grand Valley. Originally home to the Ute people, white farmers settled the town after founder William Pabor in 1884. Ten years later, Fruita was incorporated.

Economically, it started out as a fruit-producing region, but today it is well known for its outdoor sports such as mountain biking, hiking, and rafting, its proximity to the Colorado National Monument, and its annual festivals. Fruita has been the winner of the Governor's Smart Growth and Development Award for four consecutive years. The city motto is "Honor the Past, Envision the Future".

History
Fruita has had steady population growth for over a century, with descendants of many of the original pioneers still living in the area. The first permanent homesteaders in the Fruita area were possibly Mr. and Mrs. Albert Lapham who settled in late 1882. They resided in a pre-existing cabin with a dirt floor and a blanket door. They were followed by other settlers, nearly all of whom were farmers of one sort or another. The present town was established on May 1, 1884, by William E. Pabor, when he formed the Fruita Town and Land Company. In 1886, for the cost of $500 a farmer could buy five acres, 200 fruit trees and water. Pabor recognized the great promise of the Grand Valley and penned a 300-page volume, Colorado as an Agricultural State, in which he spoke of the fruit-growing potential of this area. Having worked with the Horace Greeley Union Colony, he founded the town in a similar way, including the provision that no liquor be sold or manufactured in the town. This provision lasted until it was voted out in the late 1970s.

The first water reached the town from the Colorado River in 1907. By 1909, the town center was linked with electricity. In the 1930s, Fruita participated in several government projects, including the Grand Valley Resettlement Project (later Western Slope Farms). Settled in groups of two or three families per area, 34 families were relocated by 1937. Later, the Rural Electrification Project brought electricity to around 800 or 900 farms. Fruita also had a Civilian Conservation Corps, several Works Progress Administration projects including the town library (now the Chamber of Commerce), a federal loan for the new central school (now the Civic Center) and the construction of the spectacular Rim Rock Drive to the top of the Colorado National Monument, elevation . Today, the historic activities of Fruita are supported by the efforts of the Fruita Historic Preservation Board and the Lower Valley Heritage Chapter.

On April 6, 2010, Fruita became the first city in the world to enact a marijuana tax.

Paleontology

In 1900, paleontologist Elmer Riggs and crew, from the Field Museum of Natural History in Chicago, found the first known Brachiosaurus altithorax at a location later called "Riggs Hill," located off what is now State Highway 340 in Grand Junction. Led here by communications with Dr. S.M. Bradbury of Grand Puns, Riggs had heard that ranchers had been collecting fossils around the area for 20 years. In 1901, Riggs and crew found nearly two thirds of a Brontosaurus skeleton on the northeast side of Dinosaur Hill, in Fruita. This is still considered to be one of the finest specimens known. Later, other sauropod bones were also found, which eventually led to the landmark's name. The animals were from the late Jurassic Age (150 million years ago) and within the  Morrison Formation.

Fossils of the Fruitadens (a heterodontosaurid dinosaur), the world's smallest known plant-eating dinosaur, were first found in the Fruita Paleontological Area (within the McInnis Canyons National Conservation Area) off Kings View Road in the 1970s and 1980s. The name means "Fruita tooth". There is a replica on display at the Dinosaur Journey Museum. The museum is a part of the Museum of Western Colorado and has information on local paleontology and geology.

Also found here and named after the town is the Mesozoic mammal Fruitafossor ("Fruita digger"), discovered 2005. It was a small animal at less than 10 grams body mass, and had a lifestyle similar to modern-day armadillos but was not related to them, but rather close to the ancestor of all therian mammals. Thus, this important find proves that the first "modern" mammals lived in the Jurassic already.

The region is within the Dinosaur Diamond Scenic Byway and includes two other nearby dinosaur-related sites: Mygatt-Moore Quarry and Trail Through Time off Interstate 70 exit 2.

Properties
The stone cottage building located at 432 East Aspen Avenue was built in 1938 by the Works Progress Administration. Originally built as the Fruita Museum in order to house geological displays, it has served as the home of the Fruita Times, the town library (1948–1996), and is currently in use by the Fruita Area Chamber of Commerce. Owned by the City of Fruita, it has been on the National Register of Historic Places since 1996.

The two-and-a-half-story, Queen Anne Style stone house at 798 North Mesa Street was built in 1908 by builder A.B. Mahany and first owner Harry Alvah Phillips. It is known locally as the Phillips House and currently run as the Stonehaven Bed and Breakfast. It is bordered by mature cottonwoods, agricultural land, and the Elmwood Cemetery. It is on the National Register of Historic Places.

The two-story Neoclassical building located on 325 East Aspen Avenue was built in 1912 with an addition added in 1936. It was built by the Works Progress Administration as the Central Grade School. In 1993, city and state funds enabled a major renovation, placing it on the State Register of Historic Properties. It currently is the home to the Fruita Civic Center.

Geography
Fruita is located at  (39.156594, −108.724554). Surrounding the city limits is the Colorado River, the Colorado National Monument and the Book Cliffs range which extends west into the state of Utah north of Interstate 70.

At the 2020 United States Census, the city had a total area of  including  of water.

Distance from Fruita to: Grand Junction-, Utah-, Montrose-, Glenwood Springs-, Denver-, Salt Lake City-.

Climate
Under the Köppen climate classification Fruita has a cold semi-arid climate, being a dry continental climate. Seasonal differences between the hot summers and cold winters are drastic. Even so, winter days average well above freezing due to solar warming during daytime. The coldest and hottest months of the year are January and July respectively. The average annual number of growing days is 145 days. Fruita experiences an average of 300 days of sunshine per year.

Demographics

As of the census of 2010, there were 12,646 people living in the city.

The racial makeup of the city was 90.65% White, 0.37% African American, 1.16% Native American, 0.29% Asian, 0.03% Pacific Islander, 5.45% from other races, and 2.05% from two or more races. Hispanic or Latino of any race were 11.93% of the population.

At the 2000 census there were 2,447 households, out of which 36.6% had children under the age of 18 living with them, 54.6% were married couples living together, 12.4% had a female householder with no husband present, and 29.1% were non-families. 24.3% of all households were made up of individuals, and 11.5% had someone living alone who was 65 years of age or older.  The average household size was 2.55 and the average family size was 3.04.

In the city, the 2000 census population was spread out, with 27.9% under the age of 18, 7.7% from 18 to 24, 27.5% from 25 to 44, 20.9% from 45 to 64, and 16.1% who were 65 years of age or older.  The median age was 36 years. For every 100 females, there were 89.7 males.  For every 100 females age 18 and over, there were 83.4 males.

The median income for a household in the city at the 2000 census was $32,929, and the median income for a family was $38,487. Males had a median income of $31,372 versus $20,752 for females. The per capita income for the city was $16,024.  About 8.3% of families and 12.9% of the population were below the poverty line, including 19.2% of those under age 18 and 16.8% of those age 65 or over.

Education
Fruita is a part of the Mesa County School District No. 51. The city has 5 public schools: Fruita Monument High School, Fruita 8/9 School, Fruita Middle School, Shelledy Elementary School (public), and Rim Rock Elementary School (public).

Colorado Mesa University, founded in 1925, is the closest public higher education institution. It is located in the heart of Grand Junction and supports 13 departments and over 400 instructors. Western Colorado Community College provides higher education instruction for academic transfer programs and career technical programs with nine month certificate programs, two year associate degree programs, as well as other courses for career upgrade.

Recreation
The Fruita Community Center opened its doors in January 2011 supporting community recreation such as basketball, elliptical training, exercise classes, indoor and outdoor swimming, running, volleyball, and weight training. It is a city-owned facility and is located on 324 North Coulson Street.

Biking
The area surrounding Fruita is renowned for its mountain biking trails. The most notable include the North Fruita Desert/18 Road trail system (Chutes and Ladders, Zippety-do-da, Edge Loop, Joe's Ridge, Prime Cut, Kessel Run, and others), Kokopelli Trailhead region (Mary's Loop, Horsethief Bench, Lion's Loop, Moore Fun, Rustler's Loop, Steve's Loop, Troy Built, and others). Kokopelli Trail is a  continuous single and double track trail connecting nearby Loma to Moab, Utah. In nearby Grand Junction, the popular Tabeguache trail system includes a shorter trails and a longer connecting trail to Montrose.

Road biking is also a favorite sport in the high desert climate of Fruita. Many ride the  loop along the Colorado National Monument overlooking the Grand Valley. The Fruita Farms/Highline Lake Loop is also a favorite, stretching from the town to the lake and back. Heading west on old Highway 6 to Utah is another scenic road ride.

Downtown Fruita contains several bicycle shops that sell, rent, and service both mountain and road bikes.

Birding
Many common and rare birds can be seen here, including ash-throated and gray flycatchers, bald eagles, blue herons, pinyon jays, and peregrine falcons, as well as some rare breeds such as red-throated loon and red-necked grebe. The best birding locations are the Colorado River, Colorado National Monument and Highline Lake State Park. The Grand Valley Audubon and the Colorado Birding Society are good sources of local information on birding. See also List of birds of Colorado.

Boating
Locals recreate at Highline Lake State Park for lake boating sports such as jet skiing, water skiing, ice fishing and fishing, as well as birding, hiking and camping. The Colorado River's Ruby Canyon is a favorite day and multi-day trip for kayaking and rafting. Boaters also put into the Colorado River at the James M. Robb – Colorado River State Park off State Highway 340.

Golf
Adobe Creek National Golf Course, located at 876 18 1/2 Road, offers three nine-hole courses nestled along Adobe Creek and the Colorado River. There are four golf courses available in Grand Junction.

Hiking and horseback riding

There are hiking and horseback riding trails of variable lengths available in nearby McInnis Canyons National Conservation Area including Devil's Canyon, Pollock Bench, Black Ridge Canyons Wilderness (Knowles Canyon, Mee Canyon, Moore Canyon, Rattlesnake Canyon), Colorado National Monument (Canyon Rim Trail, Coke Ovens Trail, Liberty Cap Trail, Monument Canyon Trail, Otto's Trail, Serpent's Trail, Window Rock Trail), Dinosaur Hill, Highline Lake State Park, and Rabbit Valley.

Parks

Town parks in Fruita include Circle Park at the junction of Mesa Street and Aspen Avenue, Comstock Park at 725 Galena Circle, Heritage Park at 210 I-70 Frontage Road, Little Salt Wash at 1135 18 Road, Raptor Skate Park at 273 North Cherry, Reed Park at 250 South Elm, Roberson Park at 280 West Roberson Drive, Triangle Park at 103 South Coulson Street, and Veteran's Memorial Park at 342 Hwy 340. The James M. Robb Colorado River State Park encompasses 890 acres located on State Highway 340.

Native wildlife such as eagles, bighorn sheep, and mule deer can be seen in the area.

The Riverfront Trail system follows the Colorado River through Mesa County through cottonwood groves, wetlands, and marshes. It is home to over 200 different species of birds, three endangered species of fish, and an abundance of small animals. The trail project is still in progress and plans to connect Fruita to Palisade via a paved recreation trail. The project is a collaboration of several cities, Mesa County, and state agencies and overseen by the Colorado Riverfront Commission.

Rodeo
Rimrock Rodeo takes place from June through August every Tuesday evening through the summer. A series of events showcase riders: there is a "Mutton Busting" event and the Professional Rodeo Riders "Grand Entry" event.

Running
Fruita runners take part in town races such as the July PteRANodon Ptrot, the February Sweet Heart Run, and the annual Rim Rock marathon held in November atop the Colorado National Monument. Trail running is also popular and takes place on any of the hiking trails. The Desert RATS Trail Running Festival includes 5, 10, 25, and  trail races in April, as well as the Desert RATS multi-day supported trail race along the Kokopelli's Trail from Loma to Moab.

Arts and culture
The city is scattered with public art sculptures, some metal, some stone. There are two private galleries, Rose Hue Gallery and Rye Gallery. In addition several businesses rotate displays of local artists' work. Every summer the City of Fruita puts on a summer arts camp for children and adults. The natural landscape and recreation have inspired countless painters, photographers, and sculptures to create works of art. The Fruita Arts and Culture Board supports and advocates for artists and activities in town.

Major music events of the region include the Summer Thursday night concerts Country Jam and Rock Jam in the nearby town of Mack. Shows also take place during the annual Fat Tire Festival and the Fruita Fall Festival.

The Mesa County Public Library - Fruita Branch is housed in the Fruita Community Center at 324 North Coulson Street. Nearly , the facility includes a reading room with fireplace, program room and meeting rooms.

The Fruita Times newspaper, the Grand Junction Sentinel, and the Grand Junction Free Press serve the current events needs of the region.

There are several active civic groups, including the Fruita Lions Club, Fruita Masons, and Fruita Rotary Club, as well as the non-profit Fruita Thrift shop that has been supporting the town's activities for over 50 years.

The city was involved with the 2000 independent cult horror movie "Machine Head".

Festivals

Fat Tire
Single-track mountain biking enthusiasts and friends have been celebrating the hundreds of miles of mountain bike trails around the area of Fruita and western Colorado at this festival since 1996. The three days include races, live music, a beer garden and parties. It is held every year at the end of April.

Mike the Headless Chicken
Fruita is known for Mike the Headless Chicken, a chicken who lived for 18 months after his head was cut off. Lloyd Olsen, the remover of Mike's head, continued to give him food and water with an eye dropper. He grew to be almost . Mike went on to tour the country as a side show. A festival in his honor is held each May in Fruita.

Fall
Voted "Best of the West" by the Grand Junction Daily Sentinel's readership in 2001, 2002, 2006, 2008 and 2009, the Fruita Fall Festival started in 1910 as a harvest festival for the local fruit production industry and has evolved to a major event. It includes three days of events with music, carnival rides, a parade, a bed race, a baking and canning contest, a youth pet and talent show, two stages of music, and arts and crafts vendors. The event is celebrated on the last full weekend in September.

Transportation

Air
Allegiant Airlines, American Airlines, and SkyWest Airlines (flying as both United Express and Delta Connection) provide direct service to Dallas/Fort Worth, Denver, Los Angeles, Las Vegas, Phoenix and Salt Lake City. Charter companies Colorado Flight Center and Denver Air Connection providing connections to nearby regional destinations.

Bus
Fruita is on Route 8 of the Grand Valley Transit, the operating regional bus transportation system. The bus connects Fruita stops with the Mesa Mall on U.S. Highway 6 and 50 at the 24 1/2 Road.

Highways
Fruita lies off exit 19 of Interstate 70, along U.S. Highway 6 and 50 and at the western end of State Highway 340.

Rail
This station is served by the California Zephyr train. It was originally built by the Denver and Rio Grande Western Railroad. The mainline, now used by the Union Pacific Railroad and BNSF Railway, runs east–west along the city which serves industrial rail use.

Notable people
John Otto (1870–1952) – trailblazer and first superintendent of the Colorado National Monument
Elmer Riggs (1869–1963) – paleontologist from the Chicago Field Museum
Pat Ament (born 1946) – climber, author
Maggie Baird (born 1959) – actress, screenwriter, singer-songwriter, mother of singer Billie Eilish
George Elder (1921–2022) – Major League Baseball player

See also

Colorado
Bibliography of Colorado
Index of Colorado-related articles
Outline of Colorado
List of counties in Colorado
List of municipalities in Colorado
List of places in Colorado
List of statistical areas in Colorado
Grand Junction, CO Metropolitan Statistical Area
Colorado National Monument
Fruitadens
Grand River
Grand Valley
James M. Robb – Colorado River State Park
Mike the Headless Chicken
Old Spanish National Historic Trail

References

External links

City of Fruita website
CDOT map of the City of Fruita
Fruita tourism website
Fruita Chamber of Commerce
Dinosaur Journey Museum 

 
Cities in Mesa County, Colorado
Colorado Western Slope
Cities in Colorado